Cataldo Cozza (born April 13, 1985 in Remscheid) is an Italian-German footballer, who currently plays as a defender for FC Etzella in Luxembourg.

Career
Cozza signed for Dynamo Dresden in January 2007, having previously played for Bayer Leverkusen II. He was released in 2010, and signed for Trier. Two years later he moved on to Viktoria Köln. Cozza signed for FC RM Hamm Benfica in July 2014.

Notes

1985 births
Living people
German footballers
Bayer 04 Leverkusen II players
German people of Italian descent
SC Paderborn 07 players
Italian footballers
Dynamo Dresden players
VfB Remscheid players
SV Eintracht Trier 05 players
FC Viktoria Köln players
FC RM Hamm Benfica players
3. Liga players
Association football defenders
People from Remscheid
Sportspeople from Düsseldorf (region)
Footballers from North Rhine-Westphalia